Back Burner is the third studio album by American metalcore band For the Fallen Dreams. It was released on May 24, 2011, through Rise Records and was produced by Tom Denney. Back Burner is the first album not to feature original drummer and primary songwriter Andrew Tkaczyk and final for Rise Records before their subsequent contractual release from the label.

Background
Following up from the band's previous record, Relentless, the group began writing for Back Burner by the ending months of 2010 and traveled out to Ocala, Florida to begin recording for it by the next year.

At the time of its recording, For the Fallen Dreams lacked a bassist, so the bass guitar parts were performed by the band's guitarists, Jim Hocking and Kalan Blehm.

Back Burner is the first release by the band to feature more consistent use of clean vocal passages; on most verses there is clean singing, and only two songs on the album don't feature clean vocals in the choruses ("Let Go" and "Fist Fight").

Release
It was released on May 24, 2011 through Rise Records, and was produced by Tom Denney, the former guitarist of A Day to Remember. A few days later, the band made an appearance at Bled Fest.

Track listing

Personnel
For the Fallen Dreams
Dylan Richter – lead vocals
Jim Hocking – lead guitar, backing vocals, bass
Kalan Blehm – rhythm guitar, backing vocals, bass
Will Weatherly – drums, percussion

Additional musicians
Mike Duce of Lower Than Atlantis – guest vocals on track 11, "Yellow"

Additional personnel
Tom Denney – production, engineering, mixing
For the Fallen Dreams – engineering
Landon Tewers of The Plot in You – production on bonus track "Strange Faces"
Justin Reich – photography, layout

References

Rise Records albums
2011 albums
Albums produced by Tom Denney
For the Fallen Dreams albums